Tasharvat is a small grove adjacent to a spring, en route from Jebel to Gozli Ata, in Turkmenistan. It stood in a branch of the Silk Route, and the ruins of a stone-walled caravanserai features as a tourist-spot.

In 1978–79, a few utilities were constructed by Bulgarian People's Army for the rare travelers; an inscription dedicated to Soviet-Bulgaria relations was also installed. Three stone benches, a tap for potable water, and a sculpture —all on a concrete plinth— are all that survives.

Notes

References 

Geography of Turkmenistan